Henry (died 1024), of the House of Ardenne–Luxembourg, was the count of Luxembourg (as Henry I) from 998 and the duke of Bavaria (as Henry V) from 1004.  He was the son of Siegfried I of Luxembourg and Hedwige of Nordgau.

He was the advocate of the abbeys of Saint-Maximin of Trier and Saint-Willibrord of Echternach, hereditary titles within his family.

In 1004, at the Diet of Ratisbon, he received Bavaria from his brother-in-law, the Emperor Henry II, who was also the duke of Bavaria.  During a quarrel with the emperor concerning the archbishopric of Trier, the duchy was removed from him, but he was reinstated in 1017. He never married and his county passed to his nephew Henry and Bavaria returned to the emperor, then Conrad II, who bestowed it on his son, the later Emperor Henry III.

References
 
 

Year of birth missing
1026 deaths
11th-century dukes of Bavaria
House of Luxembourg
Counts of Luxembourg